Peddemul is a village in Vikarabad district of the Indian state of Telangana. It is located in Peddemul mandal of Tandur revenue division.

Geography
Peddemul's major crops sugar-cane, Red gram

References

Villages in Vikarabad district
Mandal headquarters in Vikarabad district